The NCAA Division III women's basketball championship is the annual tournament to determine the national champions of women's NCAA Division III collegiate basketball in the United States. It was held annually from 1982, when the NCAA began to sponsor women's sports at all three levels, through 2019. No championship was held in 2020 or 2021 due to COVID-19 issues.

Washington University in St. Louis is the most successful program with five national titles. The most recent champion is Hope College.

History

1982 Final Four 
Held in Elizabethtown, Pennsylvania, the 1982 Women's Final Four Basketball Tournament was the first sponsored by the NCAA.  Featuring host Elizabethtown College, Clark College (Massachusetts), Pomona College  and the University of North Carolina at Greensboro, the tournament was played in a classic field house over a three-day period.  In the first game of the National Semi-Final Elizabethtown took control right from the tip-off against Clark and easily cruised to a 71–51 victory.  In the second game of the Final Four Pomona took the lead early in the game, but UNC Greensboro battled back to tie the game at 56 with six minutes to play. UNC Greensboro then went on a run and pulled away for a 77–66 win.  Elizabethtown and UNC Greensboro turned the championship game into an epic battle of lead changes and shifts in momentum.  Last second heroics by UNC Greensboro sent the game into overtime, but Elizabethtown came up with the final stop in overtime to win 67–66 in overtime.  Television coverage was provided by a fledgling ESPN while exclusive radio coverage was provided by KSPC Radio - Pomona College's tiny KSPC sports broadcasting group with Geoff Willis (Pomona '83) and James Timmerman (Pomona '82) providing the play by play and color.  ESPN was so embryonic that the game was broadcast multiple times during the following two weeks and ESPN hired the KSPC Radio staff to help with background and color research about the players and the teams.

Results

Championships

 Schools in italics no longer compete in NCAA Division III.

Final Fours
Schools in italics no longer compete in NCAA Division III.

See also
 NCAA Division III men's basketball tournament
 NCAA Division I women's basketball tournament
 NCAA Division II women's basketball tournament
 NAIA Women's Basketball Championships
 NAIA Division II Women's Basketball Championship

Footnotes

References

External links
 D3 Hoops.com Womens' Tourney History
 Attendance history (Archived)
 Division III Women's Basketball Championships Records Books (Through 2021) (Archived)

 
Recurring sporting events established in 1982